The 2019 Sofia Open was a tennis tournament to be played on indoor hard courts. It was the 4th edition of the Sofia Open as part of the ATP Tour 250 series of the 2019 ATP Tour. It took place at the Arena Armeec in Sofia, Bulgaria, from February 5–11.

Singles main-draw entrants

Seeds

1 Rankings as of January 28, 2019

Other entrants 
The following players received wildcards into the singles main draw:
  Adrian Andreev 
  Dimitar Kuzmanov 
  Viktor Troicki

The following players received entry from the qualifying draw:
  Daniel Brands
  Alexandar Lazarov
  Yannick Maden
  Stefano Travaglia

Withdrawals 
During the tournament
  Roberto Bautista Agut

Doubles main-draw entrants

Seeds 

 1 Rankings are as of January 28, 2019.

Other entrants 
The following pairs received wildcards into the doubles main draw:
  Adrian Andreev /  Dimitar Kuzmanov
  Alexander Donski /  Alexandar Lazarov

Withdrawals 
Before the tournament
  Nikoloz Basilashvili

Champions

Singles 

  Daniil Medvedev def.  Márton Fucsovics, 6–4, 6–3

Doubles 

  Nikola Mektić /  Jürgen Melzer def.  Hsieh Cheng-peng /  Christopher Rungkat, 6–2, 4–6, [10–2]

External links 
Official website
Tournament page at ATPWorldTour.com

References 

Sofia Open
Sofia Open
Sofia Open
Sofia Open